Frederick or Fred Conway may refer to:

Frederick B. Conway (1819–1874), American actor
Frederick William Conway (1782–1853), Irish journalist, newspaper founder and editor
Frederick Conway (artist) (1900–1973), American artist